KP Sopot is a defunct Polish football club based in Sopot, in the Pomeranian Voivodeship of northern Poland. In the 2015–16 season, they play in the sixth tier of Polish football, Klasa A, grupa Gdańsk I. In the 2007–08 season, they came through multiple rounds of regional qualification to reach the national rounds of the Polish Cup.

In 2017, the club withdrew from the A-class competitions and ceased to operate.

Name changes 
 From 1987 - MOSiR (Miejski Ośrodek Sportu i Rekreacji) Sopot
 From 1997 - FC (Football Club) Sopot
 From 2001 - KP (Klub Piłkarski) Sopot

Team colors 
Biało-Niebiesko-Żółte (White-Blue-Yellow)

Supporters groups 
Sopot Ultras, Killer Mewy, Monciak Mob, Kamionka Boys, Sea Dogs i Chłopcy z Placu Rybaka

Achievements 
 Season 2001/02 – Promoted to IV league
 Season 2002/03 - 8 place in IV league
 Season 2007/08 - Regional Winner of Polish Cup

References

External links 
 

Defunct football clubs in Poland
Sport in Sopot
Association football clubs established in 1987
1987 establishments in Poland
Association football clubs disestablished in 2017
2017 disestablishments in Poland